The 2019–20 season was PEC Zwolle's 10th season of play in the Eredivisie and also its 10th consecutive season in the top flight of Dutch football for women. When COVID-19 spread around the Netherlands all upcoming footballmatches were postponed. On the 22nd of April the KNVB ended all amateur and women footballcompetitions for the 2019–20 season. The team finished seventh in the table.

Competitions

Friendlies

Eredivisie

Results summary

Results by matchday

Matches

KNVB Cup

Eredivisie Cup

Statistics

Appearances and goals

|-

Goalscorers

Last updated: 1 March 2020

Disciplinary record

Last updated: 1 March 2020

References

PEC Zwolle seasons
PEC Zwolle Women